Campnosperma is a genus of rainforest trees in the Cashew Family (Anacardiaceae). They are found in the East Indies, south Asia and the Seychelles.

Species
, the Plants of the World Online accepts 14 species:
 Campnosperma auriculatum (Blume) Hook.f.
 Campnosperma brevipetiolatum 
 Campnosperma coriaceum (Jack) Hallier f.
 Campnosperma gummiferum (Benth.) Marchand
 Campnosperma lepidotum Capuron ex Randrianasolo & J.S.Mill.
 Campnosperma micranteium Marchand
 Campnosperma montanum Lauterb.
 Campnosperma panamense Standl.
 Campnosperma parvifolium Capuron ex J.S.Mill. & Randrianasolo
 Campnosperma schatzii Randrianasolo & J.S.Mill.
 Campnosperma seychellarum 
 Campnosperma squamatum 
 Campnosperma zacharyi 
 Campnosperma zeylanicum

References

 
Taxonomy articles created by Polbot
Anacardiaceae genera